Frédéric Cassivi (born June 12, 1975) is a Canadian former professional ice hockey goaltender who played in the National Hockey League (NHL) with the Atlanta Thrashers and Washington Capitals. A two-time winner of the Calder Cup in the American Hockey League (AHL), Cassivi was inducted to the AHL Hall of Fame in 2015.

Playing career
As a youth, Cassivi played in the 1989 Quebec International Pee-Wee Hockey Tournament with a minor ice hockey team from Francheville, Quebec.

Cassivi was originally drafted at the 1994 NHL Entry Draft in the 9th round, 210th overall, by the Ottawa Senators. Cassivi spent several years in the minors before signing with the Colorado Avalanche in 1999 as a free agent, although he would play primarily for their minor league affiliate, the Hershey Bears.

He was traded by the Avalanche to the Atlanta Thrashers in 2002 and would actually make the Thrashers lineup for parts of two seasons. He primarily saw ice time with their AHL affiliate, the Chicago Wolves. He played for the Chicago Wolves for 3 seasons, 2001–02, 2002–03 and 2003–04.  He then played for the AHL Cincinnati Mighty Ducks for the 2004–05 season and posted a season best save percentage of 0.924 and GA of 2.07 with 10 SO, while winning 25 games.

For 2005–06, Cassivi returned to the AHL Hershey Bears and the Washington Capitals and posted his most wins during the regular season, 34, en route to winning the AHL Calder Cup. Cassivi earned the Calder Cup Playoff MVP award, the Jack A. Butterfield Trophy, for his strong play in net during the series. Cassivi ranks fifth all-time in league wins (232) and is tied for eighth all-time in shutouts (24). He also ranks fifth all-time in Hershey wins with 113, fifth in appearances with 246 and seventh in shutouts with nine.

Cassivi ended his professional career in Austria, appearing in 51 games with the Vienna Capitals of the Austrian Hockey League in the 2009–10 season. He briefly came out of retirement in the 2012–13 season, giving relief to the Reading Royals in the ECHL. He also served as an emergency backup the following season.

Career statistics

Awards and honours

References

External links

1975 births
Living people
Atlanta Thrashers players
Canadian ice hockey goaltenders
Chicago Wolves players
Cincinnati Cyclones (IHL) players
Cincinnati Mighty Ducks players
French Quebecers
Halifax Mooseheads players
Hershey Bears players
Ice hockey people from Quebec
Nürnberg Ice Tigers players
Ottawa Senators draft picks
Prince Edward Island Senators players
Reading Royals players
Saint-Hyacinthe Laser players
Saint-Jean Lynx players
Sportspeople from Sorel-Tracy
Syracuse Crunch players
Thunder Bay Senators players
Victoriaville Tigres players
Vienna Capitals players
Washington Capitals players
Worcester IceCats players
Canadian expatriate ice hockey players in Austria
Canadian expatriate ice hockey players in Germany